Aseeya  is a Pakistani Bengali drama film that was released in 1960. The film produced and directed by Fateh Lohani. Story and dialogue by Nazir Hossain and also screenplay by Fateh Lohani. The film was produced in the banner of Purbani Chitro and produced by Pakistan Film Institute. Sumita Devi has starred in the main role and Shaheed, Kazi Khalek, Prabir Kumar, Bhavesh Mukherjee also played in the supporting role.

The film won the president award given by the government of Pakistan as the best Bengali film category.

Cast

Awards
 President award
 Best Bengali Film - Aseeya -  Won

References

Further reading

External links
 

1960 films
1960 drama films
Bengali-language Pakistani films
Bangladeshi drama films
1960s Bengali-language films